Genoveva, Op. 81, is an opera in four acts by Robert Schumann in the genre of German Romanticism with a libretto by Robert Reinick and the composer.  The only opera Schumann ever wrote, it received its first performance on 25 June 1850 at the Stadttheater in Leipzig, with the composer conducting.  It received only three performances during the premiere, and the negative criticism it received in the press played a decisive role in Schumann's decision to not write a second opera.

Genoveva is based on the story of Genevieve of Brabant, a medieval legend set in the 8th century that is reputedly based on the 13th century life of Marie of Brabant, wife of Louis II, Duke of Bavaria. The story gained in popularity during the first half of the 19th century, primarily in Germany through various theatrical settings.  Two of the settings from this period, Ludwig Tieck's play Leben und Tod der heiligen Genoveva (Life and Death of Saint Genoveva) and Christian Friedrich Hebbel's play Genoveva, served as the basis for the opera's libretto.

The plot of the opera has several similarities with Wagner's Lohengrin, which was composed during the same period as Schumann was writing Genoveva.

Genoveva has never won a large popular audience, but it continues to be revived at regular intervals throughout the world and has been recorded several times.

Composition history
Schumann expressed the desire to write an opera as early as 1842, and was fascinated by the possibilities of operas based on traditional German legends.  His notebooks from this period show that, among others, Schumann considered the stories of the Nibelungen, Lohengrin and Till Eulenspiegel to be good candidates for settings in German opera.

Schumann began work on Genoveva toward the end of a period of intense depression.  In the early 1840s, discouraged both by the greater public esteem enjoyed by his wife, Clara Schumann, a leading pianist as well as a composer with a high-profile career as a touring virtuoso, and by the fact that he was not offered the directorship of the Leipzig Gewandhaus, Schumann's depression intensified.  In 1844, he and Clara moved to Dresden, where his depression eventually moderated and he began work on a number of compositions, including Genoveva.

While in Dresden, Schumann encountered Richard Wagner, whose discouraging comments on Schumann's libretto for Genoveva strained relations between the two composers.  For his part, however, Schumann came to admire the dramatic impact of Wagner's operas, and the influence of Wagner's music worked its way into the score for Genoveva.  Indeed, some of the musical techniques used in the opera, such as the fluid through-composed music (i.e. there are no recitatives) and lack of purely virtuosic vocal moments, are Schumann's personal interpretations and adaptations of Wagner's compositional methods.

Although the then recently constructed Dresden Semperoper house declined to stage Genoveva, much to Schumann's fury, he eventually secured a staging in Leipzig.

Performance history
The Bielefeld Opera rediscovered Genoveva in 1995 in the first staged production worldwide in over 70 years. Conducted by Geoffrey Moull and directed by Katja Czellnik, the opera was given eight notable performances. Opera magazine of London wrote that 
"it is possible to say from the impression created by Geoffrey Moull's vigorous conducting that Schumann's theatre music is more plausible, more tense and more exciting than has so far been conceded."

The North American premiere, in a concert performance at Emmanuel Church in Boston on 2 April 2005, ended with a standing ovation.

The opera was presented by the Zurich Opera in February 2008, and again by University College Opera in March 2010.

Roles

Synopsis

Act 1
The opera begins with Hidulfus, Bishop of Trier, summoning Brabant's Christian knights to join Charles Martel's crusade against a feared Saracen conquest of Europe.  Siegfried, Count of Brabante, answers the call.  In preparing to leave for war, he entrusts his wife, Genoveva, to his young servant, Golo.

Act 2
Despite Golo's overwhelming desire for her, Genoveva persistently rejects his advances. Infuriated by these rejections, Golo seeks revenge against Genoveva by staging a trap to discredit her.  One night, Golo sneaks Drago, an old steward, into Genoveva's bedroom to fake an adulterous affair that is then witnessed by other servants, brought to the scene by Golo. In their rage, the servants kill Drago and Genoveva is imprisoned for adultery.

Act 3
Word of this imagined infidelity gets back to Siegfried, who then commands Golo to put Genoveva to death. Drago's ghost appears in front of Margaretha and tells her that if she does not reveal the truth, she will die.

Act 4
As two armed men are dispatched to kill Genoveva, her life is saved through the intervention of a mute, deaf boy.  Siegfried then discovers Golo's treachery and restores his wife's honour.

References 
Notes

External links
 
Naxos, Genoveva history and plot summary
"Schumann's life: A Brief Biography
A translation of Grimm's Saga No. 538 Siegfried and Genofeva

Compositions by Robert Schumann
1850 operas
German-language operas
Operas